Gunhild Bricken Kristina Lugn (14November 1948 – 9 May 2020) was a Swedish poet and dramatist and member of the Swedish Academy.

Early life 
Kristina Lugn was born in Tierp and grew up in Skövde where her father, Major-General Robert Lugn, served in the Skaraborg Armoured Regiment, and her mother, Brita-Stina, was a lecturer.

Career
Kristina Lugn published eight collections of poems from 1972 with her debut Om jag inte. She also wrote drama and  appeared in other media, for instance hosting the show Oförutsett which was broadcast on SVT in 1987. She hosted the show together with Jörn Donner and Bert Karlsson.

After the death of actor Allan Edwall in 1997, Lugn assumed the leadership of his small independent theatre Teater Brunnsgatan Fyra in Stockholm, where she also staged several of her own plays. She was art director for the theatre until 2011. Much appreciated by the Swedish audience, she touched on subjects such as loneliness, death and mid-life crises with irony, cynicism and black humour. After 2011 it was run by her daughter, the author Martina Montelius.

Some of her poetry has been translated into Serbian by Eleonora Luthander. Several of her plays have also been performed at Stockholm's Royal Dramatic Theatre, including Tant Blomma, Idlaflickorna, Titta en älg! and Kvinnorna vid Svansjön. In 2002, Lugn hosted her own live talkshow for guests at Teater Brunnsgatan called Seg kväll med Lugn.

Together with author Henning Mankell, Kristina Lugn wrote the novel Tjuvbadarna.

Awards, distinctions, and music
On 20 December 2006, Lugn was elected into the Swedish Academy to replace Lars Gyllensten in chair 14.

She won awards including the Dobloug Prize in 1999, the Selma Lagerlöf literature prize in 1999, the Bellman prize in 2002, the Gustaf Fröding Society's lyrics prize in 2007, and the Övralids prize in 2009.

During the wedding of Crown Princess Victoria and Daniel Westling on 19 June 2010, a newly composed piece of music called "Vilar glad. I din famn", composed by Lugn was performed.

Several known Swedish composers have worked with Lugn's poems including Gabriel Wilczkowski, Bo Ullman, Sven-David Sandström, Kim Hedås and Peter Gullin.

On 8 June 2014, Lugn was awarded the Karamelodiktstipendiet.

Death
Lugn was found dead in her home on 9 May 2020; the cause of death has not been released.

Selected bibliography
 Om jag inte (If I Not) 1972
 Till min man, om han kunde läsa (To My Husband, If He Could Read) 1976
 Döda honom! (Kill Him!)  1978
 Om ni hör ett skott (If You Hear A Gun Shot) 1979
 Percy Wennerfors 1982
 Bekantskap önskas med äldre bildad herre (Looking For Acquaintance With Educated Older Gentleman) 1983
 Lugn bara Lugn (Lugn Just Lugn) 1984
 Hundstunden (The Dog Hour) 1989
 Samlat lugn (Collected Lugn) 1997
 Nattorienterarna (The Night Orienteers) 1999
 Hej då, ha det så bra (Good Bye, Have A Great Time) 2003
Source:

Selected plays
 När det utbröt panik i det kollektiva omedvetna (When Panic Broke Out in the Collective Unconscious) 1986
 Titta det blöder (Look It's Bleeding) 1987
 Det vackra blir liksom över (The Beautiful Things Is Kind Of Left Out; American title, "The Hour of the Dog"; performed in New York and Edinburgh) 1989
 Tant Blomma (Aunt Flower; American title, "Aunt Blossom"; performed in New York) 1993
 Idlaflickorna (The Idla Girls) (American title, "The Old Girls at Lake Garda"; performed in New York) 1993
 Silver Star (performed in New York) 1995
 De tröstlösa (The Inconsolable) 1997 (written with Allan Edwall)
 Titta en älg (Look A Moose) 1999
 Stulna juveler (Stolen Jewels; performed in New York) 2000
 Eskil Johnassons flyttfirma (Eskil Johnasson's Mover Business) 2000
 Begåvningsreserven (The Talent Reserve) 2002
 Kvinnorna vid Svansjön (The Women by The Swan Lake) 2003
 Två solstrålar på nya äventyr (Two Sunbeams On New Adventures) 2003
 Var är Holger, Harald och Herrman? (Where Are Holger, Harald and Herrman?) 2004
 Vera 2005
 Det finns ett liv därborta i Vällingby (There Is A Life Over There at Vällingby) 2005
 Gråt inte mer, Cecilia. Och inte du heller, Ursula (Don't Cry Anymore, Cecilia. And Not You Either, Ursula) 2005
 Katarina den stora (Catherine The Great) 2006
 Hjälp sökes (Help Sought) 2013
 Hej, det är jag igen (Hi, It's Me Again) 2014
Source:

References

Further reading

External links 

The Brunnsgatan Fyra Theatre

1948 births
2020 deaths
People from Tierp Municipality
Swedish theatre directors
Writers from Uppland
Swedish-language poets
Swedish women dramatists and playwrights
Sommar (radio program) hosts
Swedish women radio presenters
People from Skövde Municipality
Selma Lagerlöf Prize winners
Dobloug Prize winners
Litteris et Artibus recipients
Moa Award recipients
20th-century Swedish dramatists and playwrights
21st-century Swedish dramatists and playwrights
Members of the Swedish Academy